Carolyn Jane Waldo,  (born December 11, 1964 in Montreal, Quebec) is a Canadian former synchronized swimmer and broadcaster.

Competing both as a solo and as part of a duo with Michelle Cameron, Waldo experienced tremendous success in international competition. As part of the duo with Cameron, Waldo won at the 1985 Rome and Spanish Opens, 1985 FINA World Cup, 1986 Spanish Open, 1986 Commonwealth Games, 1986 World Championships, 1987 Pan Pacific Championships and the 1987 FINA World Cup. Waldo won a silver medal in the 1984 Summer Olympics in Los Angeles. Waldo won the Olympic title in the solo and duo competitions at the 1988 Summer Olympics in Seoul, South Korea, making her the Canadian female to win two gold medals at one Olympic Games.

An Officer of the Order of Canada, a four-time winner of the Velma Springstead Trophy, Waldo retired in 1988 and worked as a sportscaster for the television station CJOH in Ottawa, Ontario, until being laid off on November 17, 2015.

During her competitive career, she was sponsored by Sears Canada.

See also
 List of members of the International Swimming Hall of Fame

References

External links
 
 
 

1964 births
Living people
Lou Marsh Trophy winners
Synchronized swimmers at the 1984 Summer Olympics
Synchronized swimmers at the 1988 Summer Olympics
Olympic gold medalists for Canada
Olympic silver medalists for Canada
Olympic synchronized swimmers of Canada
Officers of the Order of Canada
Swimmers from Montreal
Swimmers from Ottawa
Anglophone Quebec people
Canadian synchronized swimmers
Canadian television sportscasters
Women sports announcers
Olympic medalists in synchronized swimming
Medalists at the 1984 Summer Olympics
Medalists at the 1988 Summer Olympics
World Aquatics Championships medalists in synchronised swimming
Synchronized swimmers at the 1986 World Aquatics Championships
Commonwealth Games medallists in synchronised swimming
Commonwealth Games gold medallists for Canada
CTV Television Network people
Canadian women television personalities
Synchronised swimmers at the 1986 Commonwealth Games
Medallists at the 1986 Commonwealth Games